Dactylorhiza is a genus of flowering plants in the orchid family Orchidaceae. Its species are commonly called marsh orchids or spotted orchids. Dactylorhiza were previously classified under Orchis, which has two round tubers.

Description
They are hardy tuberous geophytes. In a thickened underground stem, they can store a large amount of water to survive arid conditions. The tuber is flattened and finger-like. The long leaves are lanceolate and, in most species, also speckled. Leaves higher on the stem are shorter than leaves lower on the stem. The inflorescence, compared to the length of the plant, is rather short. It consists of a compact raceme with 25-50 flowers. These develop from axillary buds. The dominant colors are white and all shades of pink to red, sprinkled with darker speckles.

Taxonomy

Etymology
The name Dactylorhiza is derived from Greek words δάκτυλος daktylos 'finger' and ῥίζα rhiza 'root', referring to the palmately two- to five-lobed tubers of this genus.

Species

Many species in this genus hybridise so readily that species boundaries themselves are vague (but see), with regular name changes and no clear answers.  A few species colonise very well onto fresh industrial wastes such as pulverised fuel ash, where vast hybrid swarms can appear for a decade or more, before ecological succession replaces them.

Dactylorhiza alpestris : Alpine Dactylorhiza (Pyrenees, Alps, Carpathians).
Dactylorhiza angustata (France).
Dactylorhiza aristata : Keyflower (E. China to Alaska).
Dactylorhiza aristata var. aristata : Keyflower (E. China to Alaska).
Dactylorhiza aristata var. kodiakensis : Kodiak Keyflower (Aleutian Is. to SW. Alaska).
Dactylorhiza armeniaca (Turkey) - has become synonym of Dactylorhiza euxina subsp. armeniaca (Hedrén) Kreutz
Dactylorhiza atlantica Kreutz & Vlaciha (Morocco)
Dactylorhiza baldshuanica (C. Asia).
Dactylorhiza baltica (Eastern Europe) (synonym of Dactylorhiza longifolia (Neuman) Aver.)
Dactylorhiza baumanniana (N. Greece).
Dactylorhiza baumanniana subsp. smolikana (B. Willing & E. Willing) H. Baumann & R. Lorenz (Greece)
Dactylorhiza bohemica (EC. Europe).
Dactylorhiza cordigera (Fr.) Soó  (SE. Europe to Ukraine).
Dactylorhiza cordigera subsp. bosniaca (N. Balkan Pen).
Dactylorhiza cordigera subsp. cordigera (SE. Europe to Ukraine).
Dactylorhiza cordigera var. graeca (H.Baumann) Presser)
Dactylorhiza cordigera subsp. pindica (B. Willing & E. Willing) H. Baumann & R. Lorenz  (NW. Greece).
Dactylorhiza cordigera var. rhodopeia Presser (Greece, Southeastern Europe, Europe)
Dactylorhiza cordigera subsp. siculorum (Romania to W. Ukraine).
Dactylorhiza ebudensis (Wief. ex R.M. Bateman & Denholm) P. Delforge : Hebridean marsh orchid
Dactylorhiza elata (Poir.) Soó : Stately Dactylorhiza (W. Europe to NW. Africa).
Dactylorhiza elata  subsp. ambigua (Martrin-Donos) Kreutz
Dactylorhiza elata subsp. brennensis (W. Europe).
Dactylorhiza elata subsp. elata (NW. Africa).
Dactylorhiza elata subsp. mauritanica B.Baumann & H. Baumann (Morocco, Algeria)
Dactylorhiza elata subsp. sesquipedalis (SW. Europe to Sicilia).
Dactylorhiza euxina (Nevski) Czerep.
Dactylorhiza euxina subsp. armeniaca (Hedrén) Kreutz
Dactylorhiza flavescens (Turkey to C. Asia).
Dactylorhiza foliosa : Richly leaved Dactylorhiza (Madeira).
Dactylorhiza fuchsii (Druce) Soó  : common spotted orchid,  Fuch's dactylorhiza  (Europe to Siberia).
Dactylorhiza fuchsii subsp. carpatica (Batousek & Kreutz) Kreutz
Dactylorhiza fuchsii subsp. fuchsii (Europe to Siberia).
Dactylorhiza fuchsii subsp. hebridensis (W. Europe).
Dactylorhiza fuchsii subsp. meyeri (Rchb.f.) Kulikov & E.G.Philippov
Dactylorhiza fuchsii subsp. okellyi (Ireland, W. Great Britain).
Dactylorhiza fuchsii subsp. psychrophila (Europe to Siberia).
Dactylorhiza fuchsii var. sooana (Borsos) Kreutz (Hungary)
Dactylorhiza fuchsii var. sudetica (Poech ex Rchb.f.) H.Baumann
Dactylorhiza gervasiana (Sicilia to S. Italy).
Dactylorhiza graeca (N. Greece) - has become synonym of Dactylorhiza cordigera var. graeca (H.Baumann) Presser)
Dactylorhiza graggeriana (W. Himalaya).
Dactylorhiza hatagirea (Pakistan to SE. Tibet).
Dactylorhiza iberica (Greece to Iran).
Dactylorhiza ilgazica (N. Turkey) - now synonym of Dactylorhiza urvilleana subsp. ilgazica (Kreutz) Kreutz
Dactylorhiza incarnata (L.) Soó  : early marsh orchid
Dactylorhiza incarnata var. baumgartneriana (B.Baumann, H.Baumann, R.Lorenz & Ruedi Peter) P.Delforge
Dactylorhiza incarnata subsp. coccinea
Dactylorhiza incarnata subsp. cruenta (Europe to Turkey).
Dactylorhiza incarnata subsp. gemmana (W. Europe).
Dactylorhiza incarnata subsp. incarnata (Europe to Mongolia).
Dactylorhiza incarnata nothosubsp. krylovii (W. Europe to Siberia).
Dactylorhiza incarnata subsp. lobelii (Norway to The Netherlands).
Dactylorhiza incarnata subsp. ochroleuca (Europe).
Dactylorhiza incarnata subsp. pulchella (Europe).
Dactylorhiza incarnata nothosubsp. versicolor (Europe)
Dactylorhiza insularis : Island Dactylorhiza (W. Medit. to WC. Italy).
Dactylorhiza kafiriana (NE. Afghanistan to W. Himalaya).
Dactylorhiza kalopissii E.Nelson (N. Greece).
Dactylorhiza kalopissii subsp. macedonica (J.Hölzinger & Künkele) Kreutz
Dactylorhiza kalopissii subsp. pythagorae (Gölz & H.R.Reinhard) Kreutz
Dactylorhiza kulikalonica (C. Asia).
Dactylorhiza lapponica (Laest.ex Hartm.) Soó (N. Europe).
Dactylorhiza lapponica subsp. angustata (Arv.-Touv.) Kreutz
Dactylorhiza lapponica subsp. rhaetica H. Baumann & R. Lorenz (Alps of Austria, Germany, Switzerland, Italy and France)
Dactylorhiza libanotica (Lebanon)
Dactylorhiza longifolia (Europe to C. Asia).
Dactylorhiza macedonica (N. Greece) - now a synonym of Dactylorhiza kalopissii subsp. macedonica (J.Hölzinger & Künkele) Kreutz
Dactylorhiza maculata (L.) Soó : heath spotted orchid, Moorland Spotted Orchid (NW. Africa, Europe to Siberia).
Dactylorhiza maculata subsp. battandieri (N. Algeria).
Dactylorhiza maculata subsp. caramulensis (W. Europe).
Dactylorhiza maculata subsp. elodes (Europe).
Dactylorhiza maculata subsp. ericetorum : heath spotted orchid (W. Europe).
Dactylorhiza maculata subsp. islandica (Iceland).
Dactylorhiza maculata subsp. kolaensis (Montell) Kreutz
Dactylorhiza maculata subsp. maculata (Europe to Siberia).
Dactylorhiza maculata subsp. maurusia (Morocco)
Dactylorhiza maculata subsp. podesta (Netherlands).
Dactylorhiza maculata subsp. rhoumensis (Great Britain)
Dactylorhiza maculata subsp. savogiensis (D.Tyteca & Gathoye) Kreutz
Dactylorhiza maculata subsp. schurii (Carpathians).
Dactylorhiza maculata subsp. sennia (Vollmar) Kreutz
Dactylorhiza maculata subsp. transsilvanica (SC. & SE. Europe).
Dactylorhiza magna (C. Asia).
Dactylorhiza majalis (Rchb.) P.F.Hunt & Summerh.  : broad-leaved marsh orchid, western marsh orchid, fan orchid, common marsh orchid (Europe).
Dactylorhiza majalis var. brevifolia (Rchb.f.) Kreutz
Dactylorhiza majalis subsp. calcifugiens (Denmark)
Dactylorhiza majalis subsp. majalis (Europe).
Dactylorhiza majalis subsp. occidentalis (W. & SW. Ireland, N. Great Britain) (synonym of Dactylorhiza kerryensis (Wilmott) P.F. Hunt & Summerhayes)
Dactylorhiza majalis subsp. parvimajalis (D.Tyteca & Gathoye) Kreutz
Dactylorhiza majalis subsp. sphagnicola
Dactylorhiza majalis subsp. turfosa (Alps to W. Carpathians) - has become a synonym of Dactylorhiza traunsteineri subsp. turfosa (F.Proch.) Kreutz
Dactylorhiza markusii :  Markus' Dactylorhiza (N. Portugal to W. Spain and Italy).
Dactylorhiza nieschalkiorum (N. Turkey).
Dactylorhiza occidentalis (Pugsley) P. Delforge : Irish marsh orchid (synonym of Dactylorhiza kerryensis (Wilmott) P.F. Hunt & Summerhayes)
Dactylorhiza osmanica (Turkey to Syria).
Dactylorhiza osmanica var. anatolica (Turkey).
Dactylorhiza osmanica var. osmanica (Turkey to Syria).
Dactylorhiza pindica (NW. Greece).
Dactylorhiza praetermissa : leopard marsh orchid, southern marsh orchid (W. & NW. Europe)
Dactylorhiza purpurella (T.Stephenson & T.A.Stephenson) Soó :  northern marsh orchid (Great Britain, Ireland).
Dactylorhiza purpurella var. maculosa (T. Stephenson)
Dactylorhiza purpurella var. purpurella
Dactylorhiza purpurella var. cambrensis (R.H.Roberts) R.M.Bateman & Denholm 2005
Dactylorhiza pythagorae (E. Aegean Is.) - now a synonym of Dactylorhiza kalopissii subsp. pythagorae (Gölz & H.R.Reinhard) Kreutz
Dactylorhiza romana : Roman Dactylorhiza (Mediterranean)
Dactylorhiza russowii (Klinge) Holub (C. Europe to Siberia)
Dactylorhiza saccifera (Brongn.) Soó  : Sack-carrying Dactylorhiza (Mediterranean)
Dactylorhiza saccifera subsp. bithynica (H.Baumann) Kreutz
Dactylorhiza saccifera subsp. gervasiana (Tod.) Kreutz
Dactylorhiza salina (Caucasus to Amur)
Dactylorhiza sambucina : elder-flowered orchid (Europe). Photos
Dactylorhiza sudetica (Europe to Siberia)
Dactylorhiza traunsteineri (Saut. ex Rchb.) Soó : narrow-leaved marsh orchid,  Traunstein's Dactylorhiza (Europe to W. Siberia).
Dactylorhiza traunsteineri subsp. carpatica (Slovakia) - has become synonym of Dactylorhiza fuchsii subsp. carpatica (Batousek & Kreutz) Kreutz
Dactylorhiza traunsteineri subsp. turfosa (F.Proch.) Kreutz
Dactylorhiza traunsteineri subsp. curvifolia (N. & NE. Europe).
Dactylorhiza traunsteineri subsp. traunsteineri (Europe to W. Siberia).
Dactylorhiza traunsteineri subsp. wirtgenii (Höppner) Kreutz
Dactylorhiza traunsteinerioides (Pugsley) Landwehr (synonym of Dactylorhiza traunsteineri subsp. traunsteineri)
Dactylorhiza umbrosa (W. & C. Asia to Siberia)
Dactylorhiza urvilleana (Steud.) H.Baumann & Künkele (N. & NE. Turkey to Iran)
Dactylorhiza urvilleana subsp. bithynica (H.Baumann) H. Baumann & R. Lorenz
Dactylorhiza urvilleana subsp. phoenissa B. Baumann & H. Baumann (Lebanon)
Dactylorhiza urvilleana subsp. ilgazica (Kreutz) Kreutz
Dactylorhiza viridis : Frog orchid (Subarctic and subalpine Northern Hemisphere).
Dactylorhiza viridis var. virescens (Temp. Asia, N. America)
Dactylorhiza viridis var. viridis (Subarctic and subalpine Northern Hemisphere)

Hybrids

Note : nothosubspecies = a hybrid subspecies; nothovarietas = subvariety.
Dactylorhiza × abantiana (D. iberica × D. nieschalkiorum) (Turkey).
Dactylorhiza × aldenii (D. iberica × D. kalopissii) (Greece).
Dactylorhiza × altobracensis (D. maculata × D. sambucina) (France, Austria).
Dactylorhiza × aschersoniana (D. incarnata × D. majalis) (W. & C. Europe).
Dactylorhiza × aschersoniana nothosubsp. aschersoniana (W. & C. Europe).
Dactylorhiza × aschersoniana nothosubsp. templinensis (D. incarnata subsp. ochroleuca × D. majalis) (C. Europe).
Dactylorhiza × aschersoniana nothovar. uliginosa (D. incarnata subsp.pulchella × D. majalis) (C. Europe).
Dactylorhiza × baicalica  (D. incarnata subsp. cruenta × D. salina) (Siberia).
Dactylorhiza × balabaniana (D. iberica × D. urvilleana) (Turkey).
Dactylorhiza × bayburtiana (D. euxina × D. umbrosa) (Turkey).
Dactylorhiza × beckeriana (C. Europe).
Dactylorhiza × boluiana (D. nieschalkiorum × D. saccifera) (Turkey).
Dactylorhiza × bourdonii  (D. brennensis × D. incarnata) (France).
Dactylorhiza × braunii (D. fuchsii × D. majalis) (Europe).
Dactylorhiza × braunii nothosubsp. braunii (Europe).
Dactylorhiza × braunii nothosubsp. lilacina (D fuchsii × D. majalis subsp. turfosa) (EC. Europe).
Dactylorhiza × braunii nothosubsp. monticola (D. fuchsii subsp. psychrophila × D. majalis) (Europe).
Dactylorhiza × braunii nothosubsp. smitakii (D. fuchsii subsp. sooana × D. majalis) (EC. Europe). te
Dactylorhiza × breviceras (D. osmanica × D. urvilleana) (Turkey).
Dactylorhiza × carnea  (D. incarnata × D. maculata subsp. ericetorum) (W. Europe).
Dactylorhiza × carnea  nothosubsp. ampolai (D. incarnata subsp. cruenta × D. maculata) (Europe).
Dactylorhiza × carnea  nothosubsp. carnea (W. Europe).
Dactylorhiza × carnea  nothosubsp. maculatiformis. (D. incarnata × D. maculata) (W. Europe).
Dactylorhiza × claudiopolitana (D. incarnata × D. schurii) (Europe.
Dactylorhiza × conigerum (D. maculata × D. viridis) (W. Europe).
Dactylorhiza × csatoi (D. cordigera × D. maculata) (SE. Europe).
Dactylorhiza czerniakowskae (C. Asia).
Dactylorhiza × daunia (D. romana × D. saccifera) (S. Europe).
Dactylorhiza × delamainii (D. elata subsp. sesquipedalis × D. maculata) (SW. Europe).
Dactylorhiza × dinglensis (D. maculata subsp. ericetorum × D. majalis subsp. occidentalis) (W. Europe).
Dactylorhiza × dinglensis nothosubsp. dinglensis (W. Europe).
Dactylorhiza × dinglensis nothosubsp. robertsii (D. maculata subsp. ericetorum × D. majalis subsp. cambrensi) (Great Britain).
Dactylorhiza × dinglensis nothosubsp. senayi (D. maculata subsp. elodes × D. majalis) (Europe).
Dactylorhiza × dinglensis nothosubsp. townsendiana (D. maculata subsp. ericetorum × D. majalis) (Europe).
Dactylorhiza × dinglensis nothosubsp. vermeuleniana (D. maculata × D. majalis) (W. Europe).
Dactylorhiza × drucei (D. majalis × D. viridis) (W. Europe)
Dactylorhiza × dubreuilhii (D. elata subsp. sesquipedalis × D. incarnata) (W. Europe).
Dactylorhiza × dufftiana (D. majalis × D. traunsteineri) (Europe).
Dactylorhiza × dufftii (D. incarnata × D. traunsteineri) (Europe).
Dactylorhiza × dufftii nothosubsp. dufftii (Europe).
Dactylorhiza × dufftii nothosubsp. gotlandica (D incarnata subsp. ochroleuca × D. traunsteineri) (Europe). Tuber geophyte
Dactylorhiza × dufftii nothosubsp. stenkyrkae (D. incarnata subsp. cruenta × D. traunsteineri) (Europe).
Dactylorhiza × erdingeri (D. sambucina × D. viridis) (W. Europe).
Dactylorhiza euxina (NE. Turkey to Caucasus).
Dactylorhiza euxinavar. euxina (NE. Turkey to Caucasus).
Dactylorhiza euxinavar. markowitschii (NE. Turkey to Caucasus).
Dactylorhiza × flixensis (D. incarnata subsp. pulchella × D. traunsteineri.) (Switzerland).
Dactylorhiza × formosa (D. maculata subsp. ericetorum × D. purpurella) (W. Europe).
Dactylorhiza × fourkensis (D. baumanniana × D. sambucina) (Greece).
Dactylorhiza × gabretana (D. incarnata × D. maculata × D. sambucina) (Europe).
Dactylorhiza × genevensis (D. incarnata × D. latifolia × D. maculata) (Europe).
Dactylorhiza × godferyana (D. majalis × D. praetermissa) (W. Europe).
Dactylorhiza × grandis (D. fuchsii × D. praetermissa) (W. Europe).
Dactylorhiza × guilhotii (D. incarnata × D. viridis) (W. Europe).
Dactylorhiza × guillaumeae (D. incarnata × D. sambucina) (W. Europe).
Dactylorhiza × gustavssonii (D. iberica × D. saccifera) (Greece to Turkey).
Dactylorhiza × hallii (D maculata subsp. ericetorum × D. praetermissa) (W. Europe).
Dactylorhiza × hallii nothosubsp. hallii (W. Europe).
Dactylorhiza × hallii nothosubsp. nummiana (D. maculata subsp. elodes × D. praetermissa) (W. Europe).
Dactylorhiza × hochreutinerana (D. alpestris × D. incarnata) (W. Europe).
Dactylorhiza × insignis (D. praetermissa × D. purpurella) (W. Europe).
Dactylorhiza × ishorica (D. incarnata × D. longifolia) (European Russia).
Dactylorhiza × jenensis (D. maculata subsp. ericetorum × D. traunsteineri) (W. & NC. Europe)
Dactylorhiza × jestrebiensis (D. bohemica × D. majalis) (EC. Europe).
Dactylorhiza × juennensis (D. fuchsii × D. lapponica) (C. Europe).
Dactylorhiza × katarana (D kalopissii × D. saccifera) (Greece).
Dactylorhiza × kelleriana (D. fuchsii × D. traunsteineri) (Europe).
Dactylorhiza × kerasovinensis (D. pindica × D. saccifera) (Greece).
Dactylorhiza × kerneriorum (D. fuchsii × D. incarnata) (Europe).
 Dactylorhiza × kerneriorum nothosubsp. kerneriorum (Europe).
Dactylorhiza × kerneriorum nothosubsp. lillsundica (D. fuchsii × D. incarnata subsp. ochroleuca) (N. & W. Europe).
Dactylorhiza × kerneriorum nothosubsp. variablis (D. fuchsii subsp. hebridensis × D. incarnata) (W. Europe). *Dactylorhiza × komiensis (D. hebridensis × D. maculata) (E. Europe).
Dactylorhiza × kopdagiana (D. iberica × D. umbrosa) (Turkey).
Dactylorhiza × koutsourana (D. baumanniana × D. smolikana) (Greece).
Dactylorhiza × kuuskiae (D.longifolia × D. traunsteineri) (E. Europe).
Dactylorhiza × latirella (D. incarnata × D. purpurella) (W. Europe).
Dactylorhiza × lehmannii (D. incarnata × D. russowii) (Europe).
Dactylorhiza × megapolitana (D. fuchsii × D. russowii) (C. Europe).
Dactylorhiza × metsowonensis (D. kalopissii × D. sambucina) (Greece).
Dactylorhiza × mixtum (D. fuchsii × D. viridis) (W. Europe).
Dactylorhiza × mulignensis (D. incarnata subsp. pulchella × D. majalis) (C. Europe).
Dactylorhiza × nevskii (D. osmanica × D. umbrosa) (Turkey).
Dactylorhiza × ornonensis (D. elata subsp. sesquipedalis × D. incarnata × D. maculata) (W. Europe).
Dactylorhiza × paridaeniana (D. elata subsp. sesquipedalis × D. praetermissa) (W. Europe).
Dactylorhiza × pontica (D. urvilleana × D. viridis) (Turkey)
Dactylorhiza × prochazkana (D. bohemica × D. maculata) (EC. Europe).
Dactylorhiza × renzii (D. incarnata × D. nieschalkiorum) (Turkey).
Dactylorhiza × rizeana (D. euxina × D. urvilleana) (Turkey).
Dactylorhiza × rombucina (D. romana × D. sambucina) (C. Europe).
Dactylorhiza × ruppertii (D. majalis × D. sambucina) (Europe).
Dactylorhiza × salictina (D. pindica × D. smolikana) (Greece).
Dactylorhiza × serbica (D. incarnata × D. saccifera) (Europe).
Dactylorhiza × serreana (D. graeca × D. lagotis) (Greece).
Dactylorhiza × sivasiana (D. umbrosa × D. urvilleana) (Turkey).
Dactylorhiza × sooi (D. alpestris × D. fuchsii.) (Europe).
Dactylorhiza × souflikensis (D. baumanniana × D. pindica) (Greece).
Dactylorhiza × stagni-novi (D. brennensis × D. fuchsii) (Europe).
Dactylorhiza × szaboiana (D. cordigera × D. sudetica) (SE. Europe).
Dactylorhiza × transiens (D. fuchsii × D. maculata subsp. ericetorum) (Europe)
Dactylorhiza × transiens nothosubsp. corylensis (D. fuchsii subsp. hebridensis × D. maculata)
Dactylorhiza × transienssubsp. ericetorum (Europe). Tuber geophyte
Dactylorhiza × transiens nothosubsp. transiens (Europe). Tuber geophyte
Dactylorhiza × turcestanicum (D. umbrosa × D. viridis) (C. Asia).
Dactylorhiza × vallis-peenae (D. majalis × D. russowii) (C. Europe).
Dactylorhiza × venusta (D. fuchsii × D. purpurella) (Europe).
Dactylorhiza × venusta nothosubsp. hebridella (D. fuchsii subsp. hebridensis × D. purpurella) (Great Britain).
Dactylorhiza × venusta nothosubsp. venusta (Europe)
Dactylorhiza × viridella (D. purpurella × D. viridis) (W. Europe).
Dactylorhiza × vitosana (D. saccifera × D. sambucina) (SE. Europe).
Dactylorhiza × vogtiana (D. iberica × D. incarnata) (Turkey).
Dactylorhiza × vorasica (D. cordigera × D. sambucina) (Greece).
Dactylorhiza × weissenbachiana (D. incarnata × D. lapponica) (C. Europe).
Dactylorhiza × wiefelspuetziana (D. maculata × D. sphagnicola) (W. Europe).

This list follows the World checklist of monocotyledons, periodically amended from the "Orchid Research Newsletter".

Distribution and habitat
These terrestrial orchids grow in basic soils in wet meadows, bogs, heathland and in areas sparsely populated by trees. They are distributed throughout the subarctic and temperate northern hemisphere. It is found across much of Europe, North Africa and Asia from Portugal and Iceland to Taiwan and Kamchatka, including Russia, Japan, China, Central Asia, the Middle East, Ukraine, Scandinavia, Germany, Poland, Italy, France, the United Kingdom, etc. Inclusion of the widespread frog orchid, often called Coeloglossum viride, into Dactylorhiza as per some recent classifications, expands the genus distribution to include Canada and much of the United States.

References

Bibliography

External links
 
 
 Flora of North America Genus page
 Dactylorhiza (Orchidaceae) in European Russia: combined molecular and morphological analysis 
 Dactylorhiza picture database
  Mayank Thakur and V. K. Dixit, Aphrodisiac Activity of Dactylorhiza hatagirea (D.Don) Soo in Male Albino Rats, Oxford Journals, Medicine, Evidence-based Compl. and Alt. Medicine, Volume 4, Supplement 1, p. 29-31

 
Orchideae genera